Ayse Romey is an American-born actress.  She starred in two German-Turkish films, Mavi Surgun and Yasemin.

She and her mother Birsel obtained a provisional order to prohibit the sale of Maxim Biller's novel "Esra", which was later confirmed by the German Federal Court, because they claimed to have seen themselves reflected in characters in the book. This verdict caused an outcry in the German public regarding the freedom of the arts (2007).

Awards
 1989: Bavarian Film Award "Best Young Actress" for Yasemin
 1989: Deutscher Filmpreis "Best Actress" for Yasemin

External links

American film actresses
Living people
American people of Turkish descent
German people of Turkish descent
American emigrants to Germany
Year of birth missing (living people)
German film actresses